Vundavalli Arun Kumar (born 4 August 1954) is a Public Speaker, Lawyer, Political Analyst and former Member of Parliament in India. He was elected to the 14th Lok Sabha and 15th Lok Sabha from Rajahmundry constituency ( officially known as Rajamahendravaram ) of Andhra Pradesh. He was a member of the Indian National Congress party.

Early life
Vundavalli Arun Kumar was born in Rajahmundry, East Godavari District, Andhra Pradesh. His father Shri Vundavalli Venkata Subba Rao had a Timber Business and was the Founder-President of the Rajahmundry Chamber of Commerce in the year 1944. His mother Smt. Vundavalli Lakshmi was the Founder-Secretary of the Guild of Service and Indian Red Cross Society, Rajahmundry Branch. He earned his bachelor's degree in commerce (B.Com.) from Government College, Rajahmundry, and also obtained a bachelor's degree in law (L.L.B) from C.R. Reddy Law College, Eluru.

Career

Jai Andhra Movement 
Arun Kumar participated in the 1972 Jai Andhra movement as a student. He runs a weekly publication, Eevaram Janavaarta, that covers contemporary political issues.

Public Speaking and Translation 
Arun Kumar is well known for his translation expertise and is very good orator and can deliver the exact message to the public. He acted as a translator for Congress Party President Sonia Gandhi and her son Rahul Gandhi whenever they had to address the people of Andhra Pradesh. He was a member of the Congress Working Committee.

Political career 
Arun Kumar was known for his public speaking abilities and in 1983 he was noticed by then President, Andhra Pradesh Congress Committee Dr. Y. S. Rajasekhara Reddy. With the encouragement and support from Y. S. Rajasekhara Reddy in 2004 and 2009, he won the Lok Sabha elections from Rajahmundry. In 2009, he won against two prominent film actors, Telugu Desam Party candidate Murali Mohan the richest actor in Telugu Film Industry and Praja rajyam [PRP] Candidate U. V. Krishnam Raju the most popular actor in Andhra Pradesh and has great influence in Rajahmundry, Andhra Pradesh. He held various positions mentioned below

Protest Against Ramoji Rao and Margadarsi Group 
Arun Kumar has filed a case against Ramoji Rao and Margadarsi group stating that the group is performing illegal financial activities, the case is in the court and yet the result is to be heard.

Retirement from Election Politics 
Vexed with the political scenario in the Indian Parliament, 2014, during the bifurcation of Andhra Pradesh State in which his party Indian National Congress did not listen to his concern about the future of the state and moreover the absence of Dr. Y. S. Rajasekhara Reddy (died in Sep, 2009) in his life let him to step down from election politics forever.

Protest to demand the implementation of AP Reorganisation Act, 2014 
After the bifurcation of Andhra Pradesh state the government at central was charges with BJP and at state it was taken over by TDP. Both TDP and BJP allied during elections and were of least concern in implementing the AP reorganisation act, 2014 and construction of Polavaram Project. Vexed with the group politics, Vundavalli Arun Kumar started writing letters to both the governments for explanation and has been demanding for open discussion regarding the same through various platforms and press meets.

Books 
Arun Kumar has great concern about the newly formed state Andhra Pradesh and has written a book Vibhajana Katha criticizing both the parties Indian National Congress and Bharatiya Janata Party who ruthlessly divided the state of Andhra Pradesh without providing a proper solution for the newly born state without a capital city. He has been inviting the State Government which is ruled by Telugu Desam Party for discussion regarding the bifurcation act and strategies to be followed during the parliament sessions which the later people don't recognize.

Arun Kumar was a very close associate of then Chief Minister of Andhra Pradesh Y. S. Rajasekhara Reddy and has been very loyal to him and was heart broken with demise of Y. S. Rajasekhara Reddy. Arun Kumar wrote a book Y.S.R THO Undavalli Arun Kumar which was released by former Andhra Pradesh Chief Minister K.Rosaiah in which he wrote his experiences with Y. S. Rajasekhara Reddy and how Y. S. Rajasekhara Reddy could become people's leader.

Personal life
He married Jyothi (his family friend) and has one daughter named Sravanthi. His mother-in-law asked him to find a pensionable job to which he agreed and has written bank examinations in which he was not successful as he was purely interested in politics only. His mother in law was satisfied and happy when he became the Member of the Indian Parliament in 2004.

References

External links

1954 births
Living people
Indian National Congress politicians from Andhra Pradesh
Telugu politicians
India MPs 2009–2014
India MPs 2004–2009
Lok Sabha members from Andhra Pradesh
People from Guntur district